KTNA (88.9 FM), is a National Public Radio-affiliated radio station in Talkeetna, Alaska. It features National Public Radio as well as diverse local music and public affairs programming.

External links
KTNA official website

KTNA
TNA
Community radio stations in the United States
TNA
Radio stations established in 1993
1993 establishments in Alaska